Dzhuli is a rural locality (a selo) in Khalagsky Selsoviet, Tabasaransky District, Republic of Dagestan, Russia. The population was 628 as of 2010. There are 4 streets.

Geography 
Dzhuli is located 23 km southwest of Khuchni (the district's administrative centre) by road. Vertil is the nearest rural locality.

References 

Rural localities in Tabasaransky District